Hwang Shin-Hye (born Hwang Jung-Man on April 16, 1963) is a South Korean actress.

Career
Hwang Shin-Hye was studying to become a flight attendant at Inha Technical College, established in 1958 as an annex to Inha Institute of Technology (parent institution of Inha University), when she began her career as a model for Taepyeongyang Cosmetics. In 1983, while still a student, she made her acting debut in the television drama Father and Son and quickly gained fame as "the most perfect face in Korea." Her first film was Bae Chang-ho's 1987 melodrama Our Sweet Days of Youth, in which she played a divorcee who marries her true love. She would also go on to star in a large number of films by director Park Chul-soo, beginning with The Woman Who Walks on Water.

Starting 1995, she took on more diverse roles, including that of a woman with an eating disorder in 301, 302, a gynecologist in Push! Push!, and a wife who sues her husband's company for depriving her of a sex life in Bedroom and Courtroom.

Hwang's last film was the 2002 gangster comedy Family, in which she played a room salon madam. After the TV series Match Made in Heaven in 2004, she went on a five-year hiatus from acting, but remained in the public eye by releasing a book and video on health and lifestyle in 2005, and for launching a successful line of women's lingerie named Elypry in 2006. Hwang also began hosting talk shows such as The Queen and Talk Club Actors, and the long-running makeover show Let Me In.

Hwang resumed her acting career in 2009, with both leading and supporting roles in the romantic comedy The Queen Returns (2009), the mystery drama Home Sweet Home (2010), the melodrama Bachelor's Vegetable Store (2011), and the sitcom Family (2012).

Personal life
Hwang Shin-Hye married businessman Park Min-Seo in 1998, but the marriage ended in divorce in May 2005. They have one daughter, Lee Jin-Yi (born Park Ji-Young on January 26, 1999), who is also a model and actress.

Filmography

Television series

Films

Variety shows

Book

Awards and nominations

Grand Bell Awards

Baeksang Arts Awards

Blue Dragon Film Awards

MBC Drama Awards

SBS Drama Awards

Grimae Awards

Korea Broadcasting Producer Awards

KBS Entertainment Awards

References

External links
Hwang Shin-hye at SM C&C

South Korean television actresses
South Korean film actresses
People from Seoul
1963 births
Living people
20th-century South Korean actresses
21st-century South Korean actresses
Best Actress Paeksang Arts Award (television) winners